The Baru Lema'a is a traditional armor from Indonesia.

Description 
The Baru Lema'a is made in the form of a vest. It consists of the braided, coarse fibers of the Iluk plant. The fibers are braided and the strands are connected again side by side. It has neither sleeves nor a collar. In the neck area a surface is protruding which is similar to two connected circles. This serves to protect the neck from blows. The vest is heavy and inflexible. It is used by ethnic groups from Indonesia.

See also 

 Baju lamina
 Baju empurau
 Baju rantai
 Baru Oroba
 Karambalangan
 Kawaca
 Siping-siping

References

Further reading 
 Joachim Freiherr von Brenner-Felsach: Eine Reise nach Nias. Unveröffentlichte Manuskripte aus dem Museum für Völkerkunde in Wien. Materialien zu Exotismus und Ethnographie. Herausgegeben von Reinhold Mittersakschmöller. Böhlau, Wien u. a. 1998, p. 179.

Indonesian inventions
Asian armour
Body armor
Military equipment of antiquity
Military equipment of Indonesia